Kim Yong-hwa (born September 25, 1971) is a South Korean film director and screenwriter. Kim wrote and directed Oh! Brothers (2003), 200 Pounds Beauty (2006), Take Off (2009) and Mr. Go (2013).

Career
Kim Yong-hwa majored in Film Studies at Chung-Ang University, but because of financial difficulties, it took him a decade to graduate. His graduation project in 1999 was the short film In the Jungle (titled "Salted Mackerel" in Korean), about two brothers (one of whom is a deaf-mute) taking care of a terminally ill mother, who are ordered to leave the hospital after they are late in paying the bills. In the Jungle won prizes at the 42nd Rochester International Film Festival and the 33rd Houston International Film Festival in 2000.

For his feature directorial debut, Kim wrote and directed Oh! Brothers, a comedy about an amoral, debt-ridden private detective who upon his father's death learns he has a younger half-brother with progeria, played by Lee Jung-jae and Lee Beom-soo. Oh! Brothers was the sixth best-selling Korean film of 2003, with 3.2 million tickets sold.

In 2006, Kim cast Kim Ah-joong in a star-making role as the protagonist of 200 Pounds Beauty (titled "It's Hard to Be a Beauty" in Korean), based on the Japanese manga Kanna's Big Success! by Yumiko Suzuki about an overweight ghost singer/phone sex operator who transforms her life after intensive plastic surgery and becomes a pop star. A romantic comedy as well as a satirical indictment of a hypocritical society that places too much value on appearance, the film's themes on beauty and self-esteem resonated with female Korean audiences, and 200 Pounds Beauty became a sleeper hit with 6.6 million admissions, making it the year's third best-selling domestic film. Kim won Best New Director at the 30th Golden Cinematography Awards in 2007, and received several nominations for directing and screenwriting.

Critics praised Kim for his smart, well-made commercial films, as well as for challenging the bias against physical disability and obesity in Korean society. Kim said, "Comedy starts off with pain. But is it really best to portray that pain in a painful way? If one has really experienced pain, and really gone to the depth of it, I doubt one will really put a raw edge on it. I am drawn to a movie that contains both joy and sadness, and at the same time remains simple and light. My answer to comedy is to include both 'a teardrop and a smile.'"

2009 sports film Take Off (titled "National Athlete" or "National Team" in Korean) became Kim's third consecutive box office hit. Starring Ha Jung-woo, Kim Dong-wook, Kim Ji-seok, Choi Jae-hwan, Lee Jae-eung and Sung Dong-il as a rag-tag group of athletes formed to support Muju City's 1996 Olympics bid but whose passion and competitive spirit won them a berth at the 1998 Nagano Winter Olympics, it was based on the true story of the oft-overlooked Korean national ski jumping team, which faced poor domestic support and unfavorable conditions but went on to win successive medals in the Winter Universiade. According to Kim, the protagonist played by Ha Jung-woo, an ex-U.S. junior alpine skier and adoptee who returns to Korea in search of his birth mother, was inspired by real-life athlete Toby Dawson. Take Off became the second highest-grossing Korean film of the year, with 8.8 million tickets sold. Kim won Best Director at the 29th Korean Association of Film Critics Awards, the 46th Grand Bell Awards, and the 30th Blue Dragon Film Awards, while Take Off won Best Film at the 17th Chunsa Film Art Awards and the 46th Baeksang Arts Awards.

Kim next took on his most ambitious project to date with Mr. Go, which had a  budget (one of the largest budgets in Korean cinema history), with  funded by China-based Huayi Brothers. Based on Huh Young-man's 1984 manhwa The 7th Team, the film centers on a 15-year-old girl (played by Xu Jiao) who tries to save her grandfather's circus after the 2008 Sichuan earthquake by becoming the sports agent of a baseball-playing gorilla named Ling Ling (inspired by Christian the lion). Mr. Go was filmed in stereoscopic 3D, and Kim founded a new visual effects company Dexter Studios to develop and innovate motion capture and facial motion capture techniques, and a digital fur production program to make the gorilla as realistic as possible; a team of more than 500 animators and CG professionals spent four years on the production and over a year editing. Mr. Go was released in South Korea and China simultaneously in 2013; it was not a commercial success in South Korea, ending Kim's winning streak at the domestic box office. However, it fared better in Mainland China where it was marketed as a children's film and shown exclusively in 3D theaters (with premium ticket prices), making more than double the South Korean gross. Mr. Go also made a name for Dexter Studios, now recognized as a VFX pioneer in Korea.

In April 2022, Kim signed a contract with United Talent Agency

Filmography 
In the Jungle (short film, 1999) - director, screenwriter
Oh! Brothers (2003) - director, screenwriter
200 Pounds Beauty (2006) - director, screenwriter
Take Off (2009) - director, screenwriter, producer
My Way (2011) - executive producer
Mr. Go (2013) - director, screenwriter, script editor, editor, executive producer
Along With the Gods: The Two Worlds (2017) - director, screenwriter
 Along with the Gods: The Last 49 Days (2018) - director, screenwriter

Awards 
2007 30th Golden Cinematography Awards: Best New Director (200 Pounds Beauty)
2009 17th Korean Culture and Entertainment Awards: Best Film Director (Take Off)
2009 Young Artist of Today: Recipient, Film category
2009 29th Korean Association of Film Critics Awards: Best Director (Take Off)
2009 46th Grand Bell Awards: Best Director (Take Off)
2009 30th Blue Dragon Film Awards: Best Director (Take Off)
2018 54th Baeksang Arts Awards: Best Director (Along with the Gods: The Two Worlds)

References

External links 
 
 
 

1971 births
Living people
South Korean film directors
South Korean screenwriters
South Korean film producers
Chung-Ang University alumni
Best Director Paeksang Arts Award (film) winners